PF-04745637 is a drug which acts as a potent and selective antagonist for the TRPA1 receptor, with an IC50 of 17nM, vs ~3μM at the related TRPV1 and TRPM channels. It has antiinflammatory effects and was developed as a potential treatment for conditions such as atopic dermatitis.

References 

Chloroarenes